Panpepato (Italian: "peppered bread") or pampepato is a round, sweet cake typical of the Province of Ferrara, Siena, the south Umbria and north of Lazio also called Pangiallo. Panpepato is a type of panforte. It is made according to traditional methods from various ingredients including fruits and nuts such as almonds, hazelnuts, pine nuts, walnuts, pepper, cinnamon, nutmeg, and zest of orange and lime, mixed according to the variants with or without cocoa, honey, flour, or cooked grape must. The cake is then baked in an oven (preferably wood). After baking, it is covered with a layer of chocolate. It is usually eaten during the Christmas holidays. Once it was prepared in every family with recipes that differed slightly from each other, while today it is essentially a handmade product.

History
Panpepato is "the direct descendant of medieval sweet breads."

References

Italian cakes
Cuisine of Emilia-Romagna
Cuisine of Tuscany
Cuisine of Lazio
Italian desserts
Christmas cakes